Racing Green Endurance (RGE) was a student-led project at Imperial College London to demonstrate the potential of zero emission cars. The team drove 26,000 km down the Pan-American Highway starting from north Alaska in July 2010, this was filmed by the documentary maker Claudio Von Planta.

Racing Green Endurance was born as a spin-off from Imperial Racing Green in late 2008. Imperial Racing Green is an undergraduate teaching project to design and build fuel cell/electric hybrid racing cars, involving around 100 students from 8 departments within the university. The students are now designing and building the third generation of fuel cell powered racers.

External links
Racing Green Endurance Website
RGE Facebook Page
Imperial College Press Article
Imperial Racing Green Website

References

Green racing